Nora Vasconcellos (born 1992) is an American professional skateboarder from Pembroke, Massachusetts.

Early life and education 
Vasconcellos graduated from Pembroke High School.

Skateboarding career 
In June 2016 Vasconcellos began riding for Adidas as an amateur skater. In 2016, Vasconcellos alongside Samarria Brevard and Leo Baker were the mystery guests on Thrasher's King of the Road Season 2. Vasconcellos placed 1st in the 2017 Vans Park Series World Championships. In 2017, she turned pro for Adidas and Welcome skateboards. In 2017, Giovanni Reda directed a short film in collaboration with Adidas titled Nora, a documentary that spotlights Vasconcellos’ journey in skateboarding from childhood to present.

Thrasher listed Vasconcellos at number 4 on The Top 10 Women & Non-Binary Skaters of 2019 list. In 2019, Vasconcellos appeared in This Way, a short film featuring Nora, Laura Enever, and Jaleesa Vincent.

References

External links 
 KRUX KRIBS | Nora Vasconcellos
 2017 Vans Park Series World Championships run
 Nora Vasconcellos - Stop And Chat | The Nine Club With Chris Roberts

Living people
American skateboarders
Female skateboarders
American sportswomen
Date of birth missing (living people)
Place of birth missing (living people)
People from Pembroke, Massachusetts
1992 births
Sportspeople from Plymouth County, Massachusetts
21st-century American women
World Skateboarding Championship medalists